Even When I Fall is a 2017 British-Nepalese documentary film directed by Sky Neal and Kate McLarnon. The film is produced by Elhum Shakerifar under the banner of Postcode Films, and Satya Films. The documentary follows Saraswoti, and Sheetal who are human trafficking survivors; once were slaves at circuses of India.

Synopsis 
Saraswoti and Sheetal met in Kathmandu. They are survivors of child trafficking in India's circuses. Both of them have been rescued and brought to Nepal; however, they return to a land they can barely remember. The documentary traces these two women over six years, as they reclaim their skills.

Reception

Critical response 
On review aggregator Rotten Tomatoes, the film holds an approval rating of 100% based on 9 reviews. The film received praise from audience and critics including The Guardian, The Irish Times, and Screen International.

Accolades

References

External links 

 
 
 

2017 films
2010s Nepali-language films
Nepalese documentary films
Documentary films about women
Documentary films about Nepal
Films shot in Kathmandu
Cultural depictions of Nepalese women
2017 documentary films